Alexander McCulloch (13 April 1887 – 5 December 1962) was a Scottish professional footballer who played as a forward in the Football League for Middlesbrough, Newcastle United, Bradford Park Avenue, Lincoln City and Merthyr Town. He also played in the Scottish League and in Wales.

Honours 
Heart of Midlothian
 Victory Cup: 1919–20

Career statistics

References

Scottish footballers
Bonnyrigg Rose Athletic F.C. players
Merthyr Town F.C. players
Lincoln City F.C. players
Newcastle United F.C. players
Middlesbrough F.C. players
Bradford (Park Avenue) A.F.C. players
English Football League players
1887 births
1962 deaths
Leith Athletic F.C. players
Brentford F.C. players
Swindon Town F.C. players
Coventry City F.C. players
Raith Rovers F.C. players
Dundee United F.C. players
Heart of Midlothian F.C. players
People from Leith
Bo'ness F.C. players
Alloa Athletic F.C. players
St Bernard's F.C. players
Broxburn United F.C. players
Dunfermline Athletic F.C. players
Aberaman Athletic F.C. players
Llanelli Town A.F.C. players
Gala Fairydean Rovers F.C. players
Scottish Football League players
Southern Football League players
Association football inside forwards
Association football forwards